Isle of Ely Rowing Club is a rowing club on the River Great Ouse based at Kiln Lane, Prickwillow Road, Ely, Cambridgeshire.

The club was founded in 2004 and has experienced major national success in recent years.

Honours

National champions

References

Sport in Cambridgeshire
Rowing clubs in Cambridgeshire
Rowing clubs in England
Rowing clubs of the River Great Ouse